Labigastera is a genus of flies in the family Tachinidae.

Species
L. forcipata (Meigen, 1824)
L. intermedia (Macquart, 1854)
L. latiforceps Tschorsnig, 2000
L. nitidula (Meigen, 1824)
L. pauciseta (Rondani, 1861)

References

Phasiinae
Diptera of Europe
Tachinidae genera
Taxa named by Pierre-Justin-Marie Macquart